The 2019–20 Ethiopian Premier League is the 73rd season of top-tier football in Ethiopia (21st season as the Premier League). The season started in November 2019. The league was halted due to the COVID-19 pandemic and the results of matches already held were declared null and void.

League table

Top scorers

References

Premier League
Ethiopia
Ethiopian Premier League
Ethiopian Premier League, 2019-20